A.R.E. Weapons is a band from New York City. Formed in 1999 by Matthew McAuley, Brain F. McPeck, and  Ryan Noel, A.R.E. Weapons has been described as "hardcore" and "electro-rock". Early reviewers placed them in the no wave category. Their live shows are noted for their aggressiveness and confrontational style.  Rough Trade was encouraged to sign the band after Pulp's Jarvis Cocker heard A.R.E. Weapons live.

A.R.E. Weapons released two singles, "Street Gang" and "New York Muscle", in 2001. Before the release of their eponymous 2003 album, synthesizer player Thomas Bullock was replaced by their manager Paul Sevigny (brother of actress Chloë Sevigny).  Guitarist Ryan Noel died in 2004 of a heroin overdose.  The remaining members recorded their second album, Free in the Streets, which was released in 2005.

Members
Matthew McAuley - bassist
Brain F. McPeck - vocalist
Paul Sevigny - synthesizer
Erik Rapin - drums

Former members
Thomas Bullock - synthesizer (left)
Ryan Noel (aka 'Rylo Nolo') - guitarist (deceased)

Timeline

Discography

Albums 
A.R.E. Weapons - April 1, 2003
Free in the Streets - September 20, 2005
Keys Money Cigarettes - March 21, 2006
Modern Mayhem - September 11, 2007
Darker Blue - November 11, 2009

Singles
Street Gang - July, 2001 - UK #73
New York Muscle - November, 2001
Hey World - May 27, 2003

There was also a four track sampler EP released in the UK, with the tracks; "Don't Be Scared", "Fuck You Pay Me", "Headbanger Face" and "Black Mercedes".

McAuley and McPeck also formed a more pop-oriented band, TV Baby, which recorded a self-titled album in 2010, with McAuley on vocals and McPeck playing the guitar.

References

External links
A.R.E. Weapons official website

Rock music groups from New York (state)
Musical groups established in 1999
Rough Trade Records artists
1999 establishments in New York City